Delta Cephei (δ Cep, δ Cephei) is the Bayer designation for a quadruple star system located approximately 887 light-years away in the northern constellation of Cepheus, the King. At this distance, the visual magnitude of the star is diminished by 0.23 as a result of extinction caused by gas and dust along the line of sight. It is the prototype of the Cepheid variable stars that undergo periodic changes in luminosity.

Discovery

Delta Cephei was discovered to be variable by John Goodricke during 1784. He describes his first observation on October 19, 1784, followed by a regular series of observations most nights until December 28. Further observations were made during the first half of 1785, the variability was described in a letter dated June 28, 1785, and formally published on January 1, 1786. This was the second variable star of this type, with eta Aquilae being discovered just a few weeks earlier, on September 10, 1784.

Properties
As well as being the prototype of the Cepheid class of variable stars, Delta Cephei is among the closest stars of this type of variable to the Sun, with only Polaris being nearer. Its variability is caused by regular pulsations in the outer layers of the star. It varies from magnitude 3.48 to 4.37, and its stellar classification also varies, from about F5 to G3. The pulsation period is 5.366249 days, with a rise to maximum occurring quicker than the subsequent decline to minimum.

Because the period of this class of variable is dependent on the star's luminosity, Delta Cephei is of particular importance as a calibrator for the period-luminosity relationship, since its distance is now one of the most precisely established for a Cepheid. This accuracy is thanks in part to its membership of a star cluster and the availability of precise Hubble Space Telescope/Hipparcos parallaxes. Hence, in 2002, the Hubble Space Telescope was used to determine the distance to Delta Cephei within a 4% margin of error: .

Radial velocity measurements of Delta Cephei have revealed the presence of a small spectroscopic companion star on a 6-year orbit around Delta Cephei A. The mass of this companion is about one tenth of the mass of Delta Cephei and the two come to within 2 astronomical units at pericenter passage. The presence of this companion will have to be taken into account when Gaia measures Delta Cephei's parallax (distance). The outer visual companion Delta Cephei C (HD 213307) may also be a spectroscopic and astrometric binary.

Stars of this type are believed to form with masses of 3–12 times that of the Sun, and then have passed through the main sequence as B-type stars. With the hydrogen consumed in their core region, these unstable stars are now passing through later stages of nuclear burning. The estimated mass of Delta Cephei, as derived from the color index, is  times the mass of the Sun. By comparison, the mass derived from evolutionary models is  times the Sun's mass. At this stage of its evolution, the outer layers of the star have expanded to an average of 44.5 times the girth of the Sun.

Delta Cephei is emitting around 2,000 times the Sun's luminosity from the outer atmosphere. This is producing a strong stellar wind, which, in combination with the pulsations and shocks in the star's atmosphere, is ejecting mass at the rate of  masses per year, or the equivalent to the mass of the Sun roughly every million years. This matter is flowing outward at a velocity of about 35 km s−1. The result of this expelled gas is the formation of a nebula about 1 parsec across, centered on Delta Cephei, and containing 0.07–0.21 solar masses of neutral hydrogen. A bow shock is being formed where the stellar wind is colliding with the surrounding interstellar medium.

The peculiar velocity of Delta Cephei is  relative to its neighbors. It is a suspected member of the Cep OB6 star cluster, and hence may be around the same age as the cluster: around 79 million years. At an angular separation of 40 arc seconds from Delta Cephei is a 7.5 magnitude companion star with the identifier HD 213307, called component C in multiple star catalogues, which is visible in small telescopes. HD 213307 itself is a binary star system with a combined stellar classification of B7–8 III–IV. It is heating the matter being ejected by the stellar wind of Delta Cephei, causing the surrounding circumstellar material to emit infrared radiation.

References

External links 
 
 

Cephei, Delta
Classical Cepheid variables
Cepheus (constellation)
G-type supergiants
F-type supergiants
4
8571
Cephei, 27
213306
110991
BD+57 2548
Cephei, 27
TIC objects